TERC may refer to:
 Telomerase RNA component, a human gene.
 TERC (Cambridge, Massachusetts), a nonprofit research and development organization in Cambridge, Massachusetts, the developers of the Investigations in Numbers, Data, and Space mathematics curriculum
 "Investigations" or TERC, a K–5 mathematics curriculum, developed at TERC (Cambridge, Massachusetts) 
 Technical Education Research Centers (TERC)
 CSIRO Tropical Ecosystems Research Centre
 Terrestrial Environment Research Center. A research center at University of Tsukuba.
 Thermal Enclosure Rater Checklist A standard for achieving green building certification in the Energy Star home rating program.
 UC Davis Tahoe Environmental Research Center (TERC). A non-profit organization that conducts research on Lake Tahoe and educated the public on environmental issues at Lake Tahoe